An anaesthetic machine (British English) or anesthesia machine (American English) is a medical device used to generate and mix a fresh gas flow of medical gases and inhalational anaesthetic agents for the purpose of inducing and maintaining anaesthesia.

The machine is commonly used together with a mechanical ventilator, breathing system, suction equipment, and patient monitoring devices; strictly speaking, the term "anaesthetic machine" refers only to the component which generates the gas flow, but modern machines usually integrate all these devices into one combined freestanding unit, which is colloquially referred to as the "anaesthetic machine" for the sake of simplicity. In the developed world, the most frequent type in use is the continuous-flow anaesthetic machine or "Boyle's machine", which is designed to provide an accurate supply of medical gases mixed with an accurate concentration of anaesthetic vapour, and to deliver this continuously to the patient at a safe pressure and flow. This is distinct from intermittent-flow anaesthetic machines, which provide gas flow only on demand when triggered by the patient's own inspiration.

Simpler anaesthetic apparatus may be used in special circumstances, such as the triservice anaesthetic apparatus, a simplified anaesthesia delivery system invented for the British Defence Medical Services, which is light and portable and may be used for ventilation even when no medical gases are available. This device has unidirectional valves which suck in ambient air, which can be enriched with oxygen from a cylinder, with the help of a set of bellows.

History
The original concept of continuous-flow machines was popularised by Boyle's anaesthetic machine, invented by the British anaesthetist Henry Boyle at St Bartholomew's Hospital in London, United Kingdom in 1917, although similar machines had been in use in France and the United States. Prior to this time, anaesthesiologists often carried all their equipment with them, but the development of heavy, bulky cylinder storage and increasingly elaborate airway equipment meant that this was no longer practical for most circumstances. Contemporary anaesthetic machines are sometimes still referred to metonymously as "Boyle's machine", and are usually mounted on anti-static wheels for convenient transportation.

Many of the early innovations in anaesthetic equipment in the United States, including the closed circuit carbon-dioxide absorber (a.k.a. the Guedel-Foregger Midget) and diffusion of such equipment to anaesthesiologists within the United States can be attributed to Richard von Foregger and The Foregger Company.

Components of a typical machine

A modern anaesthetic machine includes at minimum the following components:
 Connections to piped oxygen, medical air, and nitrous oxide from a wall supply in the healthcare facility, or reserve gas cylinders of oxygen, air, and nitrous oxide attached via a pin index safety system yoke with a Bodok seal
 Pressure gauges, regulators and 'pop-off' valves, to monitor gas pressure throughout the system and protect the machine components and patient from excessive rises
 Flowmeters such as rotameters for oxygen, air, and nitrous oxide
 Vaporisers to provide accurate dosage control when using volatile anaesthetics
 A high-flow oxygen flush, which bypasses the flowmeters and vaporisers to provide pure oxygen at 30-75 litres/minute
 Systems for monitoring the gases being administered to, and exhaled by, the patient, including an oxygen failure warning device
Systems for monitoring the patient's heart rate, ECG, blood pressure and oxygen saturation may be incorporated, in some cases with additional options for monitoring end-tidal carbon dioxide and temperature. Breathing systems are also typically incorporated, including a manual reservoir bag for ventilation in combination with an adjustable pressure-limiting valve, as well as an integrated mechanical ventilator, to accurately ventilate the patient during anaesthesia.

Anaesthetic machines are distinct from anaesthesia carts, which hold various adjuncts for anaesthesia such as intravenous medications, syringes, needles and other items of equipment that the anesthetist providing anaesthesia might need.

In dentistry a simplified version of the anaesthetic machine, without a ventilator or anaesthetic vaporiser, is referred to as a relative analgesia machine. By using this machine, the dentist can administer a mild inhalation sedation with nitrous oxide and oxygen, in order to keep their patient in a conscious state while depressing the feeling of pain.

Safety features of modern machines
Based on experience gained from analysis of mishaps, the modern anaesthetic machine incorporates several safety devices, including:
 an oxygen failure alarm (a.k.a. 'Oxygen Failure Warning Device' or OFWD). In older machines this was a pneumatic device called a Ritchie whistle which sounds when oxygen pressure is 38 psi descending. Newer machines have an electronic sensor.
 Nitrous cut-off or oxygen failure protection device, OFPD: the flow of medical nitrous-oxide is dependent on oxygen pressure. This is done at the regulator level. In essence, the nitrous-oxide regulator is a 'slave' of the oxygen regulator. i.e., if oxygen pressure is lost then the other gases can not flow past their regulator.
 hypoxic-mixture alarms (hypoxy guards or ratio controllers) to prevent gas mixtures which contain less than 21-25% oxygen being delivered to the patient. In modern machines it is impossible to deliver 100% nitrous oxide (or any hypoxic mixture) to the patient to breathe. Oxygen is automatically added to the fresh gas flow even if the anaesthesiologist should attempt to deliver 100% nitrous oxide. Ratio controllers usually operate on the pneumatic principle or are chain linked (link 25 system). Both are located on the rotameter assembly, unless electronically controlled.
 ventilator alarms, which warn of low or high airway pressures.
 interlocks between the vaporizers preventing inadvertent administration of more than one volatile agent concurrently
 alarms on all the above physiological monitors
 the Pin Index Safety System prevents cylinders being accidentally connected to the wrong yoke
 the NIST (Non-Interchangeable Screw Thread) or Diameter Index Safety System, DISS system for pipeline gases, which prevents piped gases from the wall being accidentally connected to the wrong inlet on the machine
 pipeline gas hoses have non-interchangeable Schrader valve connectors, which prevents hoses being accidentally plugged into the wrong wall socket

The functions of the machine should be checked at the beginning of every operating list in a "cockpit-drill". Machines and associated equipment must be maintained and serviced regularly.

Older machines may lack some of the safety features and refinements present on newer machines. However, they were designed to be operated without mains electricity, using compressed gas power for the ventilator and suction apparatus. Modern machines often have battery backup, but may fail when this becomes depleted.

The modern anaesthetic machine still retains all the key working principles of the Boyle's machine (a British Oxygen Company trade name) in honour of the British anaesthetist Henry Boyle. In India, however, the trade name 'Boyle' is registered with Boyle HealthCare Pvt. Ltd., Indore MP.

A two-person pre-use check (consisting of an anaesthesiologist and an assistant) of the anaesthetic machine is recommended before each case and has been shown to decrease the risk of 24-hour severe postoperative morbidity and mortality. Various regulatory and professional bodies have formulated checklists for different countries. Machines should be cleaned between cases as they are at considerable risk of contamination with pathogens.

See also
 Ether Dome
 History of general anesthesia

References

External links 

 Virtual Anesthesia Machine (VAM) — a free transparent reality simulation of a generic anaesthetic machine from the University of Florida
 Various anaesthesia-related simulations
 Virtual Anaesthesia Textbook
 AnaesthesiaUK.com — resources for UK anaesthetists in training
 History of Richard von Foregger and the Foregger Company — written by his son, R. Foregger, this website chronicles one of the leading manufacturers and developers of anesthesiology equipment in the early 20th century.
 Checking anaesthetic machines
 Anesthesia Equipment & Instruments: Definitions & Principles of Practical Usage

Anesthetic equipment
Machines
Drug delivery devices
Dosage forms